Orinocosa is a genus of spiders in the family Lycosidae. It was first described in 1916 by Chamberlin. , it contains 9 species.

Species
Orinocosa comprises the following species:
Orinocosa aymara Chamberlin, 1916
Orinocosa celerierae Cornic, 1976
Orinocosa guentheri (Pocock, 1899)
Orinocosa hansi (Strand, 1916)
Orinocosa paraguensis (Gertsch & Wallace, 1937)
Orinocosa priesneri Roewer, 1959
Orinocosa pulchra Caporiacco, 1947
Orinocosa securifer (Tullgren, 1905)
Orinocosa tropica Roewer, 1959

References

Lycosidae
Araneomorphae genera
Spiders of Asia
Spiders of Africa
Spiders of South America